The 2nd constituency of Charente-Maritime (French: Deuxième circonscription de la Charente-Maritime) is one of five electoral districts in the department of Charente-Maritime, each of which returns one deputy to the French National Assembly in elections using the two-round system, with a run-off if no candidate receives more than 50% of the vote in the first round.

Description
The constituency is made up of nine cantons: those of Aigrefeuille-d'Aunis, Aytré, Courçon, La Jarrie, Marans, Rochefort-Centre, Rochefort-Nord, Rochefort-Sud, and Surgères.

At the time of the 1999 census (which was the basis for the most recent redrawing of constituency boundaries, carried out in 2010) the 2nd constituency had a total population of 112,535.

Deputies

Election results

2022

 
 
 
 
 
 
 
|-
| colspan="8" bgcolor="#E9E9E9"|
|-

2017

2012

|- style="background-color:#E9E9E9;text-align:center;"
! colspan="2" rowspan="2" style="text-align:left;" | Candidate
! rowspan="2" colspan="2" style="text-align:left;" | Party
! colspan="2" | 1st round
! colspan="2" | 2nd round
|- style="background-color:#E9E9E9;text-align:center;"
! width="75" | Votes
! width="30" | %
! width="75" | Votes
! width="30" | %
|-
| style="background-color:" |
| style="text-align:left;" | Suzanne Tallard
| style="text-align:left;" | Socialist Party
| PS
| 
| 31.50%
| 
| 52.99%
|-
| style="background-color:" |
| style="text-align:left;" | Jean-Louis Leonard
| style="text-align:left;" | Union for a Popular Movement
| UMP
| 
| 34.22%
| 
| 47.01%
|-
| style="background-color:" |
| style="text-align:left;" | David Baudon
| style="text-align:left;" | Miscellaneous Left
| DVG
| 
| 12.60%
| colspan="2" style="text-align:left;" |
|-
| style="background-color:" |
| style="text-align:left;" | Joan Desire
| style="text-align:left;" | Front National
| FN
| 
| 9.36%
| colspan="2" style="text-align:left;" |
|-
| style="background-color:" |
| style="text-align:left;" | Gérard Blanchier
| style="text-align:left;" | Left Front
| FG
| 
| 4.78%
| colspan="2" style="text-align:left;" |
|-
| style="background-color:" |
| style="text-align:left;" | Patrick Angibaud
| style="text-align:left;" | Europe Ecology – The Greens
| EELV
| 
| 3.81%
| colspan="2" style="text-align:left;" |
|-
| style="background-color:" |
| style="text-align:left;" | Dominique Droin
| style="text-align:left;" | Miscellaneous Right
| DVD
| 
| 1.43%
| colspan="2" style="text-align:left;" |
|-
| style="background-color:" |
| style="text-align:left;" | Victor Domingues
| style="text-align:left;" | Miscellaneous Left
| DVG
| 
| 0.84%
| colspan="2" style="text-align:left;" |
|-
| style="background-color:" |
| style="text-align:left;" | Jean-Luc Delcampo
| style="text-align:left;" | Miscellaneous Left
| DVG
| 
| 0.68%
| colspan="2" style="text-align:left;" |
|-
| style="background-color:" |
| style="text-align:left;" | Frédéric Castello
| style="text-align:left;" | Far Left
| EXG
| 
| 0.43%
| colspan="2" style="text-align:left;" |
|-
| style="background-color:" |
| style="text-align:left;" | Claude Billot Zeller
| style="text-align:left;" | Far Right
| EXD
| 
| 0.35%
| colspan="2" style="text-align:left;" |
|-
| colspan="8" style="background-color:#E9E9E9;"|
|- style="font-weight:bold"
| colspan="4" style="text-align:left;" | Total
| 
| 100%
| 
| 100%
|-
| colspan="8" style="background-color:#E9E9E9;"|
|-
| colspan="4" style="text-align:left;" | Registered voters
| 
| style="background-color:#E9E9E9;"|
| 
| style="background-color:#E9E9E9;"|
|-
| colspan="4" style="text-align:left;" | Blank/Void ballots
| 
| 0.90%
| 
| 1.60%
|-
| colspan="4" style="text-align:left;" | Turnout
| 
| 58.57%
| 
| 59.19%
|-
| colspan="4" style="text-align:left;" | Abstentions
| 
| 41.43%
| 
| 40.81%
|-
| colspan="8" style="background-color:#E9E9E9;"|
|- style="font-weight:bold"
| colspan="6" style="text-align:left;" | Result
| colspan="2" style="background-color:" | PS GAIN FROM UMP
|}

2007

|- style="background-color:#E9E9E9;text-align:center;"
! colspan="2" rowspan="2" style="text-align:left;" | Candidate
! rowspan="2" colspan="2" style="text-align:left;" | Party
! colspan="2" | 1st round
! colspan="2" | 2nd round
|- style="background-color:#E9E9E9;text-align:center;"
! width="75" | Votes
! width="30" | %
! width="75" | Votes
! width="30" | %
|-
| style="background-color:" |
| style="text-align:left;" | Jean-Louis Leonard
| style="text-align:left;" | Union for a Popular Movement
| UMP
| 
| 42.98%
| 
| 50.20%
|-
| style="background-color:" |
| style="text-align:left;" | André Bonnin
| style="text-align:left;" | Socialist Party
| PS
| 
| 29.99%
| 
| 49.80%
|-
| style="background-color:" |
| style="text-align:left;" | Jacques Maret
| style="text-align:left;" | Democratic Movement
| MoDem
| 
| 5.05%
| colspan="2" style="text-align:left;" |
|-
| style="background-color:" |
| style="text-align:left;" | Corinne Cap
| style="text-align:left;" | The Greens
| VEC
| 
| 3.98%
| colspan="2" style="text-align:left;" |
|-
| style="background-color:" |
| style="text-align:left;" | Gérard Blanchier
| style="text-align:left;" | Communist
| PCF
| 
| 3.49%
| colspan="2" style="text-align:left;" |
|-
| style="background-color:" |
| style="text-align:left;" | Thierry Joulin
| style="text-align:left;" | Hunting, Fishing, Nature, Traditions
| CPNT
| 
| 3.35%
| colspan="2" style="text-align:left;" |
|-
| style="background-color:" |
| style="text-align:left;" | Marie-Françoise Catalan
| style="text-align:left;" | Front National
| FN
| 
| 3.14%
| colspan="2" style="text-align:left;" |
|-
| style="background-color:" |
| style="text-align:left;" | Denis Poulain
| style="text-align:left;" | Far Left
| EXG
| 
| 2.59%
| colspan="2" style="text-align:left;" |
|-
| style="background-color:" |
| style="text-align:left;" | Dominique Droin
| style="text-align:left;" | Movement for France
| MPF
| 
| 2.00%
| colspan="2" style="text-align:left;" |
|-
| style="background-color:" |
| style="text-align:left;" | Michel Bel
| style="text-align:left;" | Independent
| DIV
| 
| 1.10%
| colspan="2" style="text-align:left;" |
|-
| style="background-color:" |
| style="text-align:left;" | Anne Bernon
| style="text-align:left;" | Far Left
| EXG
| 
| 0.85%
| colspan="2" style="text-align:left;" |
|-
| style="background-color:" |
| style="text-align:left;" | Laurent Talbot
| style="text-align:left;" | Independent
| DIV
| 
| 0.70%
| colspan="2" style="text-align:left;" |
|-
| style="background-color:" |
| style="text-align:left;" | Jean-Claude Deborde
| style="text-align:left;" | Far Left
| EXG
| 
| 0.50%
| colspan="2" style="text-align:left;" |
|-
| style="background-color:" |
| style="text-align:left;" | Fabrice Restier
| style="text-align:left;" | Miscellaneous Right
| DVD
| 
| 0.28%
| colspan="2" style="text-align:left;" |
|-
| colspan="8" style="background-color:#E9E9E9;"|
|- style="font-weight:bold"
| colspan="4" style="text-align:left;" | Total
| 
| 100%
| 
| 100%
|-
| colspan="8" style="background-color:#E9E9E9;"|
|-
| colspan="4" style="text-align:left;" | Registered voters
| 
| style="background-color:#E9E9E9;"|
| 
| style="background-color:#E9E9E9;"|
|-
| colspan="4" style="text-align:left;" | Blank/Void ballots
| 
| 1.79%
| 
| 2.31%
|-
| colspan="4" style="text-align:left;" | Turnout
| 
| 60.17%
| 
| 60.38%
|-
| colspan="4" style="text-align:left;" | Abstentions
| 
| 39.83%
| 
| 39.62%
|-
| colspan="8" style="background-color:#E9E9E9;"|
|- style="font-weight:bold"
| colspan="6" style="text-align:left;" | Result
| colspan="2" style="background-color:" | UMP HOLD
|}

2002

 
 
 
 
 
 
 
 
|-
| colspan="8" bgcolor="#E9E9E9"|
|-

1997

References

Sources
 Notes and portraits of the French MPs under the Fifth Republic, French National Assembly
 2012 French legislative elections: Charente-Maritime's 2nd constituency (first round and run-off), Minister of the Interior

2